Consort Xun may refer to:

Noble Consort Xun (1758–1798), concubine of the Qianlong Emperor
Imperial Noble Consort Gongsu (1857–1912), concubine of the Tongzhi Emperor